Mai Ginge Jensen (born 1984) is a Danish ten-pin bowler. She finished in 2nd position of the combined rankings at the 2006 AMF World Cup. During the final round she finished in 7th position.

References

Living people
1984 births
Danish ten-pin bowling players
Place of birth missing (living people)
Competitors at the 2022 World Games
World Games gold medalists
World Games medalists in bowling
20th-century Danish women
21st-century Danish women